Radaczewo  (German: Reichenbach) is a village in the administrative district of Gmina Choszczno, within Choszczno County, West Pomeranian Voivodeship, in north-western Poland.

For the history of the region, see History of Pomerania.

References

This is the site of the village Radaczewo not find a lot of great news.
Here it is Radaczewo24.pl

Radaczewo